Nicholas Palmieri (born July 12, 1989) is an American former professional ice hockey player. He was selected by the New Jersey Devils in the third-round  of the 2007 NHL Draft.

Playing career
As a youth, Palmieri played in the 2002 Quebec International Pee-Wee Hockey Tournament with a minor ice hockey team from Syracuse, New York.

Palmieri played his first National Hockey League game with the New Jersey Devils on January 20, 2010, against the Florida Panthers, during which he scored his first NHL point, an assist on a Travis Zajac goal. His first NHL goal was an empty-net goal scored on January 9, 2011, against the Tampa Bay Lightning. His first game-winning goal was scored against the Dallas Stars.

On February 24, 2012, Palmieri was involved in a multiplayer trade by the Devils along with Stephane Veilleux and Kurtis Foster and additional draft picks to the Minnesota Wild in exchange for Marek Zidlicky.

On February 4, 2013, Palmieri was traded by the Wild, along with forward Darroll Powe, to the New York Rangers in exchange for veteran forward Mike Rupp. In August 2013, Palmieri signed with EHC München of the Deutsche Eishockey Liga.

After two seasons in Germany, Palmieri left the Schwenninger Wild Wings as a free agent, signing a one-year deal in the Neighboring Austrian EBEL on a one-year deal with Italian outfit, HCB South Tyrol on October 16, 2015. In the 2015–16 season, Palmieri made an immediate impression in Italy, contributing with 10 goals and 25 points in 43 games. On May 19, 2016, Palmieri opted to extend his tenure with the foxes in agreeing to a further one-year deal.

Career statistics

Regular season and playoffs

International

References

External links 

1989 births
Living people
Albany Devils players
Belleville Bulls players
Bolzano HC players
Connecticut Whale (AHL) players
Erie Otters players
Houston Aeros (1994–2013) players
Ice hockey players from New York (state)
Lowell Devils players
Minnesota Wild players
EHC München players
New Jersey Devils draft picks
New Jersey Devils players
Sportspeople from Utica, New York
Schwenninger Wild Wings players
American men's ice hockey right wingers